The 1996 Lijiang earthquake occurred at 19:14 on 3 February near Lijiang City, Yunnan in southwestern China. The shock measured 6.6 on the moment magnitude scale and had a maximum Mercalli intensity of X (Extreme).

Earthquake
According to authorities, up to 322 people died and more than 17,000 were injured. About 358,000 buildings were destroyed, and 320,000 people were made homeless.

Damage
The earthquake destroyed many structures and buildings in the region; property damage was estimated at 506 million US dollars. In addition to damage to structures, it triggered more than 200 landslides in a 12,000 km2 area. Many further landslides occurred in the months afterwards, as monsoon rains swept away debris already loosened, and as late as 1999, scientists warned that widespread ground fracturing throughout much of the area might lead to further landsliding in the event of heavy rain.

Aftershocks
One hundred and eighty-four aftershocks occurred in the first 26 hours, including 18 which measured between 4.0 and 4.8 on the Richter scale.

Aftermath
Many high-rise buildings in the area were torn down and traditional single-family dwellings were constructed in their place. Reconstruction assistance from the provincial government and the World Bank was used to restore traditional streets, bridges, and canals. These efforts played a major role in Lijiang's efforts to achieve the World Heritage Site designation by UNESCO.

See also
List of earthquakes in China
List of earthquakes in Yunnan

References

Further reading

External links

1996 Lijiang
1996 disasters in China
1996 earthquakes
Lijiang earthquake 1996
Lijiang earthquake
Geography of Lijiang